Toussaint Mayimbi is a footballer from the Republic of Congo who plays for Diables Noirs. A member of the Republic of Congo national football team, Mayimbi scored 1 goal in the 2008 African Cup of Nations qualifying tournament, against Chad.

References

External links
 

Year of birth missing (living people)
Living people
Republic of the Congo footballers

Association footballers not categorized by position
Republic of the Congo international footballers